The Battle of Kelley Creek, also known as the Last Massacre, is often considered to be one of the last known massacres carried out between Native Americans and forces of the United States, and was a closing event to occur near the end of the American Indian warfare era.  In January 1911 a small band of Shoshones were accused of rustling cattle and then killing four stockmen who went to investigate the dead cattle.  A posse of policemen and citizens was sent to track the band, who were found encamped near Winnemucca, Nevada, in a region known as Kelley Creek. A largely one-sided battle ensued on February 25 that ended with the direct deaths of nine people, eight Daggetts and one posse member. At the time the affair was briefly characterized as a Native American revolt, though it is now mostly regarded as a family's attempted escape from law enforcement.

Background
Mike Daggett, or Shoshone Mike (only after his death), was the chief of the small band and in the spring of 1910, he led his group of eleven off the Fort Hall Reservation at Rock Creek, Idaho. All but two men of the group were members of Mike's family, which included three women and four or five children. They first headed south into northern Nevada where a son of Shoshone Mike called Dugan was mortally wounded by white cattle rustlers and in revenge the band killed Frank Dopp in May 1910 and buried him; his remains were found 2 months later.

The Daggett band realized that they had little chance of justice in the hands of the Whites so they traveled west to Oroville, California, before heading back into Nevada to spend the winter at Little High Rock Canyon in northern Washoe County.  In January 1911 the Daggett band was running low on food, so they abducted and butchered some cattle belonging to a local rancher. A Basque sheepherder named Bert Indiano witnessed the event but was driven away by the Indians; he alerted the people of Surprise Valley, California, who sent a posse of three men to investigate the incident and protect the ranch. The three men, Harry Cambron and two prominent Basque sheepmen, Peter Erramouspe and John Laxague, were to go to the ranch and join up with the sheepherder so the four could investigate the scene. A day or two prior to the arrival of the four stockmen, the Indians had robbed several articles from a camp of an unnamed Chinese man whom they then met and killed when the man said he was going to kill them; the body was then buried. Upon arrival the posse of four men instead ran into Mike Daggett and two of his sons, who were reported to be waiting for them.

Last Massacre
The Daggetts had apparently realized the stockmen would be coming to find them, so when the posse entered the canyon on January 19, the natives opened fire with rifles and pistols, killing all four of them (Harry Cambron and the three Basque sheepmen Bert Indiano, Peter Erramouspe and John Laxague).  On February 8, a search party from Eagleville, California found the bodies in a creekbed.  The bodies were mutilated, partially undressed and had numerous gunshot wounds.  When word of the killings reached the surrounding settlements many who felt at risk temporarily evacuated the area, and the men who stayed behind remained armed and alert at all times. Initially it was thought that a gang of outlaws from Oregon or a band of Modocs were responsible. The Nevada and California State Police organized a posse under the command of Captain J.P. Donnelley to find the suspects, who had decided to flee towards the Duck Valley Indian Reservation. Other posses were also organized (though only Donnelley's would ever make contact with the Daggetts), and a large cash bounty was promised to anyone who managed to arrest or kill the fugitives.

Battle
Donnelley's posse included at least five policemen, a few armed civilians, and the "county coroner and physician". After stopping in Little High Rock Canyon on February 13, they continued despite extreme cold and winter weather. Over 200 miles further and on February 25, the posse found Daggett and his family hiding in an area known as Kelley Creek, northeast of Winnemucca. It is unclear which side shot first, but a battle erupted that lasted for around three hours. The women reportedly fought equally alongside the men. Father and chief Mike Daggett was one of the first casualties during the battle, but his death only made the members of his family desperately fight back harder; even as they were inevitably forced back. At some point during the conflict the remaining Daggetts had run out of ammunition for their guns and were forced to resort to bows, spears and tomahawks. By the end of the battle only four of the original twelve Daggett family members were still alive: a sixteen-year-old girl and three young children, who were taken into police custody. One member of Donnelley's posse, Deputy Ed Hogle of Eagleville, was killed during the fight. Two other young Daggett children were also reported to have been shot inadvertently.
After the battle was over, the posse found evidence linking the killings in Little High Rock Canyon to the natives. Other than Mike's war bonnet, the posse found guns and a watch that had belonged to Harry Cambron, identified by brother Ben Cambron.

The bodies of the natives were taken by wagon to Golconda, Nevada, and buried in a mass grave made from the crater of a dynamite explosion. A tall pole was placed at the site as a grave marker. Years later when the land was donated to the Museum of National History the site was excavated and partial remains found.  Eventually, the remains were donated by a local rancher to the Smithsonian Institution.  In 1994 the remains were repatriated to the Fort Hall Idaho Shoshone-Bannock Tribe. 

In 1911, the remains of Ed Hogle were returned to Eagleville, where he was buried. Sheriff Charles Ferrell, who was in command of the investigation (but not present at the battle) arrived back in Reno on March 2 with the four surviving captives, and they claimed that while the man had indeed been Shoshone Mike, their mother was Bannock. The four were informally adopted by Reno's civilian population until in May 1911 they were enrolled in the Stewart Indian School near Carson City, Nevada. By 1913, three of the children had died of natural causes, and only one of the survivors, Mary Jo Estep was left alive; she died in 1992. The reward offered to anyone who could catch or kill the Daggett party was initially denied to the posse by Governor Tasker Oddie, due to the fact that there were state policemen involved, but the case was later settled in favor of the posse by the Supreme Court of Nevada in 1915.

A marker was placed near the battle site. The Twin Creeks gold mine is located just to the east of the marker.  The 1996 environmental impact statement for the mine mentions a reconfiguration of an overburden and interburden site so as to avoid the location of the marker.

See also
Bannock War
Bannock Uprising
Ruby Murders

References

Further reading
 
 
 

American frontier
Battles involving the United States
20th-century military history of the United States
1911 in the United States
Conflicts in 1911
Shoshone
Bannock people
1911 in Nevada
February 1911 events
Native American history of California
Native American history of Nevada